Ri Se-ung (born 22 December 1998) is a North Korean Greco-Roman wrestler. He is a two-time silver medalist at the Asian Wrestling Championships in the men's 60 kg event.

In 2014, he won the gold medal in the men's 42 kg event at the 2014 Summer Youth Olympics held in Nanjing, China.

In 2019, he represented North Korea at the 2019 Military World Games held in Wuhan, China and he won the gold medal in the 60 kg event.

References

External links 
 

Living people
1998 births
Place of birth missing (living people)
North Korean male sport wrestlers
Wrestlers at the 2014 Summer Youth Olympics
Wrestlers at the 2018 Asian Games
Youth Olympic gold medalists for North Korea
Asian Games competitors for North Korea
Asian Wrestling Championships medalists
21st-century North Korean people